Mosteiros (also: Cidade da Igreja) is a city in the northeastern part of the island of Fogo, Cape Verde. It is situated on the coast, 24 km northeast of the island capital São Filipe. It is the seat of the Mosteiros Municipality and of the civil parish Nossa Senhora da Ajuda. At the 2010 census its population was 9,524 making it the island's second most populated place.

The cultivation of coffee was introduced on Fogo in the 18th century. The coffee plantations in the municipality of Mosteiros are situated between 350 and 1300 m elevation, where they benefit from rich volcanic soils and a good micro-climate. Annual production was 500 tonnes in 1900, but this has declined to just over 100 tonnes per year. The church Igreja Matriz is worth a visit. Praça do Entroncamento is the town's main square. The local airport Mosteiros Airport has been closed in favor of São Filipe Airport. From São Filipe, Mosteiros can be reached by "aluguer" buses several times a day. 

The main celebration is of Nossa Senhora da Ajuda celebrated around August 15.

Climate
Mosteiros has a steppe climate (Köppen classification BSh). The wettest months are August and September. Average annual temperature is 23.2 °C.

Sports
Cutelinho FC, Nô Pintcha FC dos Mosteiros and Atlético Mosteiros are the football (soccer) clubs of the city. There are also local basketball, futsal and volleyball teams. It has a football (soccer) stadium named Estádio Francisco José Rodrigues. Its multi-use indoor arena is named João de Joia.

See also
List of cities and towns in Cape Verde

References

External links
Official website 
Groundwater Resources of Mosteiros Basin, Island of Fogo, Cape Verde (article by Victor M. Heilweil, Stephen B. Gingerich, L. Niel Plummer and Ingrid M. Verstraeten, U.S. Geological Survey Fact Sheet 2010, p. 3069)

 
Cities in Cape Verde
Municipal seats in Cape Verde
Populated coastal places in Cape Verde
Geography of Fogo, Cape Verde